Gumani railway station is a railway station located in the town of Gumani in Sahebganj district of Jharkhand. This station is under construction and soon will be developed.

References

Railway stations in Sahibganj district
Howrah railway division